Kleisthenis I Programme is the common name of Greek law 4555/2018 of July 2018, a major administrative reform in Greece. It brought about the third major reform of the country's administrative divisions following the 1997 Kapodistrias reform and the 2010 Kallikratis Programme. Named after ancient Greek legislator Cleisthenes, the programme was adopted by the Hellenic Parliament in July 2018 and implemented in September 2019.

The goal of the Kleisthenis I Programme was to reform the election procedures and to strengthen the competences of the local administrative units. The main changes were:
municipal elections take place every 4 years (formerly every 5 years)
municipal and regional referendums can be organised
six categories of municipalities were introduced
the distinction between municipal communities and local communities (as subdivisions of municipalities) was abolished

Also, five municipalities that were created at the Kallikratis reform (Corfu, Cephalonia, Servia-Velventos, Lesbos and Samos) were divided into smaller municipalities.

See also
List of municipalities of Greece (2011)
Administrative divisions of Greece
Municipalities and communities of Greece

References

External links
 ΦΕΚ A 133/2018, Full text of Law 4555/2018 (Kleisthenis I) in the Government Gazette of the Hellenic Republic

Greek legislation
Subdivisions of Greece
2018 in Greek politics
Reform in Greece
Mergers of administrative divisions
Public administration